The HS2 rolling stock are trains for the under-construction High Speed 2 (HS2) high-speed rail line in the United Kingdom.

The initial order for phase 1 and 2a was for 'conventional compatible' trains and will be capable of leaving the dedicated high-speed sections to continue onto existing lines, where the loading gauge would be more restricted. In the later phase 2b, a number of 'captive' trains (unable to use the existing rail network) may be ordered to operate alongside the conventional compatible trains, with a similar loading gauge to existing European high speed trains.

The contract for the first batch was awarded to a 50/50 joint venture between Hitachi Rail and Alstom, for 54 conventional compatible trains, which will be constructed in the United Kingdom. The trains will be based on a revised version and evolution of the Zefiro V300 platform.

History 
A modelling of costs and risks in the project in 2012 estimated that captive trains may cost around £27million per train and the conventional compatible trains, which will be built for the United Kingdom loading gauge, could have cost around £40million.

The first batch of rolling stock for HS2 is specified in the Train Technical Specification issued with the Invitation To Tender (ITT), which was initially published in July 2018, being revised in March 2019 following clarification questions from tendering companies.

Five bids were shortlisted for the first HS2 rolling stock contract:

 Alstom, a French company, bid for the HS2 trains with its United Kingdom managing director Nick Crossfield stating “Alstom’s vision is to make HS2 trains a timeless design classic, with a passenger experience that is as smooth, calm and spacious as it is high-speed.”
 Bombardier Transportation, comprises a Canadian company, and Hitachi Rail, a Japanese company. This partnership built Frecciarossa 1000 high-speed trains in Italy.  Bombardier was later acquired by Alstom making the bid a partnership between Alstom and Hitachi.
 Construcciones y Auxiliar de Ferrocarriles (CAF), a Spanish company, these trains would be based on its Oaris platform. The director of CAF Rail UK Richard Garner said “The Oaris platform uses the latest technology to offer high-speed travel and has demonstrated its capacity to operate at speeds over 360 km/h – combined with the advantages of proven reliability, comfort and safety.”
 Talgo, a Spanish company. These trains would be based on its  AVRIL platform. Talgo UK's Jon Veitch stated “HS2 will be crucial as the UK economy grows. We humbly believe that Talgo’s combination of experience and adaptivity is the best option for both train operating companies and taxpayers.”
 Siemens, a German company. William Wilson, CEO of Siemens Mobility has said “Our team has worked tirelessly to develop an offer that transforms how passengers experience high-speed trains and set the standard for other global high-speed rail systems to follow."

On 9 December 2021, the contract was awarded to the Hitachi Rail-Alstom joint venture.

There have been reports of legal challenges related to the contract. A challenge by Talgo was settled out of court. 
Siemens sought an injunction to stop the contract being awarded but is now only seeking damages. It has been reported that this is to help it secure contracts for other elements of the HS2 project.

The contract was to be awarded in spring 2020, but was delayed due to delays to the start of HS2 construction. The contract was then scheduled for October 2021 but was not awarded until December 2021 as it awaited government approval.

Initial train class

The contract to build the trains for the 54 conventional compatible trains for phases 1 and 2a is worth £1.97billion, which includes an initial 12-year maintenance contract for the trains, with the option to extend this to the design life of the trains (of 35 years).

Vehicle body assembly and initial fitting out of the trains will take place at the Hitachi Newton Aycliffe factory, the bogies will be manufactured at the Alstom factory in Crewe, and final assembly and fit-out, including the interiors, electronics and bogies, will take place at Alstom's factory in Derby.

The first train will finish production around 2027. They will enter service when phase 1 and 2a of HS2 opens between 2029 and 2033.

The trains will feature regenerative braking and Hitachi Rail's low noise pantograph, whilst also being 15% lighter and feature 30% more seats than comparable high speed trains in Europe. The trains will also be the fastest trains in the United Kingdom and Europe.

The interior layout will be decided following a two and a half year  design process involving HS2 Ltd, the Department for Transport and the West Coast Partnership.

References

External links

High-speed trains of the United Kingdom
Alstom multiple units
Hitachi multiple units
25 kV AC multiple units